The 2002 State Farm Women's Tennis Classic was a women's tennis tournament played on outdoor hard courts in Scottsdale, Arizona, United States that was part of the Tier II category of the 2002 WTA Tour. It was the third edition of the tournament and ran from February 26 through March 3, 2002. Third-seeded Serena Williams won the singles title and earned $93,000 first-prize money.

Finals

Singles
 Serena Williams defeated  Jennifer Capriati 6–2, 4–6, 6–4
 It was Williams' 1st singles title of the year and the 12th of her career.

Doubles
 Lisa Raymond /  Rennae Stubbs defeated  Cara Black /  Elena Likhovtseva 6–3, 5–7, 7–6

References

External links
 ITF tournament edition details
 Tournament draws

State Farm Women's Tennis Classic
State Farm Women's Tennis Classic
2002 in American tennis
2002 in sports in Arizona